
Charles Feltman (1841–1910) was a German-American restaurateur. He is one of several claimed inventors of the hot dog.

From pushcart to restaurant mogul
Feltman was born in 1841 in Germany and emigrated to America in 1856, at the age of fifteen. He was familiar with the frankfurter, named for Frankfurt-am-Main in his native land. Feltman's operation began operating a pushcart pie wagon at the Coney Island beach in 1867, selling fresh pies to beachfront hotels. When his customers began asking him to add sandwiches to serve as well he added a small charcoal stove to his cart and began selling pork sausages on rolls which he called "red hots" and later "hot dogs."

Henry Collins Brown, a New York historian, explained its attraction: "It could be carried on the march, eaten on the sands between baths, consumed on a carousel, used as a baby's nipple to quiet an obstreperous infant, and had other economic appeals to the summer pleasure seeker".

However, it took some time for the public to decide what to call Feltman's creation. Frankfurter, sausage, Coney Island red hot; none of them really captured the public's imagination. Coney Island chicken and weenie (from the Austrian wienerwurst) both had their proponents. But it was popular uncertainty about exactly what kind of meat was in these casings that ultimately determined that it would be called "hot dog".

in 1871, Feltman leased land and began building his restaurant complex. It achieved its heyday in the 1920s, serving nearly 5,250,000 people a year, being a large restaurant complex with several restaurants, two bars, a beer garden, a famous carousel, and other attractions, and offering many types of food beyond hot dogs.

Nathan Handwerker was working at Feltman's as a roll slicer when he quit to found rival Nathan's. Handwerker undersold Feltman, offering hot dogs for five cents instead of ten, at a more downscale operation than Feltman's, but eventually Nathan's became the most successful and iconic Coney Island hot dog purveyor and a nationwide brand which thrived into the 21st century.

Family and business after his death
Feltman died in 1910 (he is interred at Green-Wood Cemetery in Brooklyn, New York) after which his family ran the business. Feltman's sons Charles L. Feltman and Alfred F. Feltman and grandson Charles A. Feltman, who had been operating the restaurant, sold the operation in  1946 to Alvan Kallman and others. The restaurant closed in 1954. The land was later used to construct the Astroland amusement park which opened in 1962 and closed in 2008, subsequently  replaced by a new Luna Park. The last remnant of Feltman's – the building that had housed the kitchen – was demolished in 2010.

Charles' Feltman's grandson Charles A. Feltman invented the Shooting Star Tommy Gun, a pneumatic BB machine gun used in fair and amusement park stalls for many decades and continuing well into the 21st century (the device is used by players to shoot out all traces of a red star on a paper target). Shooting Star Games was founded by Charles A. Feltman and continues to manufacture the device in the 21st century. There was for years a shooting gallery on the original Feltman's site.

In the 2010s, entrepreneur Michael Quinn opened a hot dog emporium named Feltman's of Coney Island in New York's East Village, in homage to the original Feltman's and on Memorial Day, 2017, he cut the ribbon on a Coney Island location in the very structure where the aforementioned shooting gallery had been located, on the original Feltman's site.

References

1841 births
1910 deaths
Hot dogs
People from Brooklyn
German emigrants to the United States